Thomas Birch (1779 – January 3, 1851), was an English-born American portrait and marine painter.

Biography 
Birch was born in Wawickshire, England.  He came to the U. S. in 1794, and assisted his artist father, William Birch, in preparing a 29-plate collection of engravings:Birch's Views of Philadelphia (1800). Subscribers to the series included President John Adams and Vice President Thomas Jefferson. This sold well and went into multiple editions, inspiring similar collected views of New York City, and of suburban estates surrounding Philadelphia and Baltimore. The son's first major painting appears to have been a view of Philadelphia from the Treaty Elm in Kensington, which was also engraved and published in 1804. He painted portraits until about 1807, when he took up marine-painting. Some of his most famous works depict naval battles of the War of 1812.

"Birch was the first American ship portraitist, and his paintings were copied by countless artists and craftsmen in America and Europe." In addition to ships, they provide valuable images of bridges, lighthouses, docksides, and harbor fortifications in the Early Republic, especially those surrounding New York City and Philadelphia. His paintings of suburban mansions and rural snow scenes were often turned into engravings.

Historically, the Birches' most important work may be a circa-1801 engraving documenting the unfinished U.S. Capitol. Another, may be the son's painting depicting an 1812 naval battle between USS United States and HMS Macedonian, that hung in the Oval Office of U.S. President John F. Kennedy. It was sold at auction in 2008, setting a record price for the artist of $481,000.

An assessment from 1867:
Marine landscapes were painted thirty years ago by an Englishman in Philadelphia — Thomas Birch. The freshness of his atmosphere and clearly-painted waves were a marked feature. His delineation of the engagement between the U.S. frigate Constitution and the British frigate Guerriere, and that between the United States and the Macedonian — each four by two feet six inches — are fine specimens of this artist, and of rare historical value.

He exhibited regularly at the Pennsylvania Academy of the Fine Arts for forty years, beginning in 1811, and managed the museum, 1812–17. His work is collected at PAFA, the Library Company of Philadelphia, the Philadelphia Museum of Art, the Smithsonian American Art Museum, the U.S. Naval Academy, and the Museum of Fine Arts, Boston, among others. In 1833, he was elected into the National Academy of Design as an Honorary member. He died in Philadelphia, Pennsylvania.

Gallery

References
Marian Carson, "Thomas Birch", Catalogue of the 150th Anniversary Exhibition of the Pennsylvania Academy of the Fine Arts, (PAFA, 1955), p. 34.
Doris Jear Creer, Thomas Birch: A Study of the Condition of Painting and the Artist's Position in Federal America, M.A. thesis, University of Delaware, 1958.
William H. Gerdts, Thomas Birch (1779–1851), Paintings and Drawings, exhibition catalogue, Philadelphia Maritime Museum, 1966.
Richard Anthony Lewis, "Interesting Particulars and Melancholy Occurrences: Thomas Birch's Representations of the Shipping Trade, 1799–1850", 3 vols., Ph.D. dissertation, Northwestern University, 1994.
Tony Lewis, "Sleigh Ride on a Grey Day, 1832", "American Paintings", (Schwarz Galleries, 2003), pp. 36–38. 
Stefanie A. Munsing, "Thomas Birch (1779–1851)", Philadelphia: Three Centuries of American Art, (Philadelphia Museum of Art, 1976), pp. 229–30.
Michael W. Schantz, Celebrating Philadelphia's Artistic Legacy, (Woodmere Art Museum, 2000), pp. 23–24.
Martin P. Snyder, "William Birch: His Philadelphia Views", Pennsylvania Magazine of History and Biography, vol. 73 (1949), pp. 271–315.
S. Robert Teitelman, Birch's Views of Philadelphia, with Photographs of the Sites in 1960 & 1982, (Free Library of Philadelphia, 1982, reprinted University of Pennsylvania Press, 1983).

External links
Biography from ushistory.org
 artcyclopedia.com
 brooklynmuseum.org
 View of the Delaware near Philadelphia, 1831, Corcoran Gallery of Art, Washington, D.C.
The Mariners' Museum

1779 births
1851 deaths
Painters from London
Artists from Philadelphia
English emigrants to the United States
18th-century American painters
18th-century American male artists
American male painters
19th-century American painters
American marine artists
National Academy of Design members
19th-century American male artists